The Chicago, Rock Island, and Pacific Railroad Depot was a historic railroad station off Arkansas Highway 10 in Blue Mountain, Arkansas.  It was a single-story rectangular wood-frame structure, with a hip roof whose deep eaves were supported by triangular brackets.  The station was built in the late 1890s to serve the local Chicago, Rock Island and Pacific Railroad line, and was a significant element of the community's growth until the 1930s.  In 1939 it was purchased by a local community group and moved four lots from its original site, for use as a community center.

The station was listed on the National Register of Historic Places in 1978.  It has since been demolished.

See also
National Register of Historic Places listings in Logan County, Arkansas

References

Railway stations on the National Register of Historic Places in Arkansas
National Register of Historic Places in Logan County, Arkansas
Railway stations in the United States opened in 1898
Blue Mountain
1898 establishments in Arkansas
Former railway stations in Arkansas